Isaac Mensah (born 13 December 1995) is a Ghanaian professional footballer who plays as a midfielder for Angolan side Atlético Petróleos de Luanda. He previously played for Ghanaian club Accra Hearts of Oak.

Career 
Mensah began his career with Ghanaian club Accra Hearts of Oak. He played there from 2012 to 2017. He moved to Egypt and joined Al Ittihad Alexandria Club in August 2017. He left the club in December 2017 and returned to his former club Hearts of Oak. His second stint was from January 2018 to September 2018, of which he secured a deal to Angolan top club Atlético Petróleos de Luanda.

References

External links 
 

Living people
1995 births
Association football midfielders
Ghanaian footballers
Accra Hearts of Oak S.C. players
Ghana Premier League players
Al Ittihad Alexandria Club players
Ghanaian expatriate footballers
Ghanaian expatriate sportspeople in Egypt
Egyptian Premier League players
Atlético Petróleos de Luanda players
Ghanaian expatriate sportspeople in Angola
Girabola players